"Happy Nation" is a song recorded by Swedish group Ace of Base from their debut album with the same name (1992). It was first released in Scandinavia in December 1992 and later released twice in the UK. The first appearance was in October 1993, when it peaked at number 42, it reentered the chart twelve months later at number 40. "Happy Nation" reached number-one on the singles charts of Denmark, Finland, France and Israel in 1993 and 1994. In 2008, the song was remade by Ace of Base for a remix kit.

"Happy Nation" is a mid-tempo dance-pop song with strong influences from reggae fusion and euro house. It was written by Jonas "Joker" Berggren and Ulf "Buddha" Ekberg and contains both English and Latin lyrics. The first verse is sung in Latin by Joker, and Linn Berggren sings the rest as the lead singer. The band has described the song, written as a response to reports of Ekberg's past associations with neo-Nazi skinheads, as an "anti-fascist song and a hymn to life". Ekberg has also said the song is a response to "everybody talking about how bad everything is! ... I think [the] best thing is to see [the] positive."

Chart performance
"Happy Nation" was quite successful on the charts in Europe. Although not as big as "All That She Wants", the song managed to make some impact, reaching the number-one position in Denmark, Finland, France and Israel. It peaked within the top 5 in Lithuania, the Netherlands and in the group's native Sweden, where it hit number four. Additionally, the single was a top 10 hit in Austria, Belgium, Germany and Norway. In Iceland, it reached the top 20, while in Italy and Switzerland, it was a top 30 hit. In the UK, it only reached the top 40, in its second run on the UK Singles Chart, peaking at number 40 on October 9, 1994. On the Eurochart Hot 100, which was based on national singles sales charts in 17 European countries, "Happy Nation" charted at number 39 in May 1993. Outside Europe, the single made it to number-one in Israel, number 22 in New Zealand and number 80 in Australia. It did not chart in the US. "Happy Nation" was awarded with a gold record in Germany with 250,000 singles sold and a silver record in France, after 125,000 units were sold.

Critical reception
AllMusic editor Jose F. Promis complimented the song as "stellar". In an retrospective review, Annie Zaleski of American online newspaper The A.V. Club noted that it takes influence from "taut techno". Fort Worth Examiner felt that it "provides a positive mindset for how we should relate to and live with one another." Swedish Göteborgsposten stated that the reggae-rhythms from "All That She Wants" also "shows up" in the song, but "most of the sound is taken from European synth-based music." Chuck Eddy from LA Weekly declared it "the record's saddest-sounding song". Andrew Balkin from Kingston Informer said that "the Aces go downbeat" on "Happy Nation" and "Wheel of Fortune", adding further that both songs "have a soul/dance feel about them and wouldn't be out of place on the dance floor, or setting the mood in a smoky club." In another article, the newspaper described it as "a luvvly bubbly song". James Masterton viewed it as "another piece of darkly brilliant dub reggae" in his weekly UK chart commentary. Mario Tarradell from Miami Herald stated, "Just try to shake the irresistible hook of All That She Wants and Happy Nation: you won't succeed." 

When the single was released for the second time in the UK, Alan Jones from Music Week rated it three out of five, deeming it as a "fairly unambitious regga plod" that "will inevitably do better this time around, but it will still be one of their smaller hits." A reviewer from People Magazine felt that the tune "prove Ace of Base to be more substantive than a mere ABBA clone." Bob Waliszewski of Plugged In remarked that it "promotes brotherhood". James Hamilton from the RM Dance Update viewed it as a "rumbling Boney M-ish 0-95.9bpm lurcher". Chuck Campbell from Scripps Howard News Service called it a "reggae-paced" number. Sylvia Patterson from Smash Hits gave it two out of five. She added, "Much moodier than the unfeasibly catchy All That She Wants thing, thank goodness, this is sort of like R.E.M.'s Shiny Happy People if it was by The Beloved, if you see what I mean. A pan-global religo-spook reverie with warbly Indian bits on and some whistling." Edna Gundersen from USA Today complimented it as a "cheery tune". The Vindicator stated that "the blend of melody and rhythm" in a song like "Happy Nation" "is all but irresistible".

Music video
The accompanying music video of "Happy Nation" was directed by Swedish-based director Matt Broadley, who had previously directed the video of "All That She Wants". It was shot in Gothenburg, Sweden in January 1993. The video was later published on Ace of Base's official YouTube channel in October 2010. It reached more than 85 million views as of December 2022.

Synopsis
The video begins with a lit candle, the flame of which blowing to the side. During Joker's verse, he sings flanked on both sides by a candelabrum, with Linn's face and different ancient symbols and pictures moving in the background. These images include the peace symbol, runic inscriptions, Egyptian hieroglyphs, Indigenous Australian art, the Buddha, the Zodiac signs, the yin yang symbol, the Crucifixion of Jesus, Al-Fatiha, and the book The Origin of Species by Charles Darwin. After Joker's verse, the rest of the video focuses on Linn singing. She is mostly seen standing, but at one point she is seen sitting at a long wooden table, appearing to be deep in thought. At other times, Jenny Berggren appears singing with Linn for a moment even though like in All That She Wants she didn't provided any vocals for this song . The background images continue to appear during this part, along with scenes of Buddha typing on a stationary computer, Jenny reading from an old book, Joker singing the background vocals, and other short clips featuring the band members. Old movie footage is also shown during Linn's section, such as an atomic bomb exploding, people walking, and a tree falling down. When the music fades out, the lit candle shown at the start of the video is blown out.

Track listings
 7" single
 "Happy Nation" (Radio Edit) — 3:32
 "Happy Nation" (Album Version) — 4:11

 CD single - UK
 "Happy Nation" (Radio Edit) — 3:32
 "Happy Nation" (12 inch Version) — 6:39
 "Happy Nation" (Album Version) — 4:11

 CD maxi
 "Happy Nation" (Gold Zone Club Mix)
 "Happy Nation" (Gold Zone 7" Edit)
 "Happy Nation" (Gold Dub Edit)
 "Happy Nation" (Moody Gold Mix)

Charts and sales

Weekly charts

Year-end charts

Certifications

Personnel
 Vocals by Linn Berggren 
 Latin Choir by Jonas Berggren
 Backing Vocals by John Ballard
 Written by Jonas Berggren and Ulf Ekberg
 Produced by Jonas Berggren and Ulf Ekberg
 Recorded at Tuff Studios

Release history

Other recordings
During the 6th series of Så mycket bättre in 2015, Niklas Strömstedt performed the song in Swedish as "Lyckolandet", with lyrics against racism and xenophobia.

References

External links
 

1993 singles
Ace of Base songs
Eurodance songs
Mega Records singles
Number-one singles in Denmark
Number-one singles in Finland
Number-one singles in Israel
SNEP Top Singles number-one singles
Songs written by Jonas Berggren
Songs written by Ulf Ekberg
Music videos directed by Matt Broadley
Reggae fusion songs
English-language Swedish songs
Latin-language songs
1992 songs